Eprozinol is a drug for obstructive airway disease.

References

Piperazines
Secondary alcohols
Phenylethanolamine ethers
Bronchodilators